The Statute Law Revision (Isle of Man) Act 1991 (c 61) is an Act of the Parliament of the United Kingdom.

Section 1(1) and Schedule 1 provided that the enactments which were repealed (whether for the whole or any part of the United Kingdom) by the following Acts were thereby repealed so far as they extended to the Isle of Man:
Statute Law Revision Act 1861
Statute Law Revision Act 1863
Statute Law Revision Act 1867
Statute Law Revision Act 1871
Statute Law Revision Act 1872
Statute Law Revision (No.2) Act 1872
Statute Law Revision Act 1873
Statute Law Revision Act 1874
Statute Law Revision (No.2) Act 1874
Statute Law Revision Act 1875
Statute Law Revision Act 1883
Statute Law Revision Act 1887
Statute Law Revision Act 1892
Statute Law Revision Act 1893
Statute Law Revision (No. 2) Act 1893
Statute Law Revision Act 1894
Statute Law Revision Act 1898
Statute Law Revision Act 1908
Statute Law Revision Act 1927
Statute Law Revision Act 1948
Statute Law Revision Act 1950
Statute Law Revision Act 1953
Statute Law Revision Act 1958
Statute Law Revision Act 1959
Statute Law Revision Act 1963
Statute Law Revision Act 1964
Statute Law Revision Act 1966
Statute Law (Repeals) Act 1969
Statute Law (Repeals) Act 1971

Section 1(2) and Schedule 2 provided for miscellaneous repeals.

See also
Statute Law Revision Act

References
Halsbury's Statutes. Fourth Edition. 2008 Reissue. Volume 41. Page 933.
Hansard

External links
The Statute Law Revision (Isle of Man) Act 1991, as amended from the National Archives.
The Statute Law Revision (Isle of Man) Act 1991, as originally enacted from the National Archives.

United Kingdom Acts of Parliament 1991